Robert Sandford (died 1459/60), of Askham, Westmorland, was a Member of Parliament for Appleby in May 1413. He was an important figure in Cumberland gentry society, and was related by marriage to the sheriff, Thomas de la More, a servant of Richard Neville, 5th Earl of Salisbury.

References

14th-century births
1459 deaths
People from Eden District
Members of Parliament for Appleby
English MPs May 1413
15th-century English politicians
Year of birth unknown
Place of birth unknown
Year of death uncertain
Place of death unknown